The Isle of Wight Festival 2009 was the eighth revived Isle of Wight Festival to be held at Seaclose Park in Newport on the Isle of Wight. The event took place from 12 to 14 June. Headline acts were confirmed for Friday, Saturday and Sunday nights as The Prodigy, Stereophonics, Simple Minds and Neil Young respectively.

On 8 June 2009 it was reported that tickets for the festival had sold out, however in an attempt to combat ticket touts, a limited number were held on the door.

New features
In February 2009 The Charlatans were announced as headline acts for The Big Top Arena, which has continued from 2008. However lead singer Tim Burgess was given the extra role of curating Sunday's activity by choosing his favourite bands to perform there.

Highlights

 A return aerial display by the Red Arrows on Saturday afternoon.
 Paolo Nutini doing a surprise performance on the acoustic stage.
 Neil Young closing his headline set by tearing apart his electric guitar in tribute to Jimi Hendrix.
 Neil Young performing a cover of the Beatles 'A Day in the Life'.
 Cheeky banter featuring throughout Goldie Lookin' Chain's set.

Line Up

Main stage
Friday
 The Prodigy
 Basement Jaxx
 Pendulum
 The Ting Tings
 Iglu & Hartly
 Sneaky Sound System

Saturday
 Stereophonics
 Razorlight
 Maxïmo Park
 White Lies
 Paolo Nutini
 The View
 Sharon Corr
 The Rifles
 The Zombies
 The Yeah You's
 Majortones

Sunday
Neil Young
Pixies
 Simple Minds
 The Pigeon Detectives
 The Script
 Goldie Lookin Chain
 Judy Collins
 Arno Carstens
 Papa Do Plenty

The Big Top
Thursday (Campers only)
The Human League
King Meets Queen
The Complete Stone Roses
 DJ sets by Rusty Egan

Friday
Bananarama
Ladyhawke
Alesha Dixon
The Noisettes
Beverley Knight
Eddi Reader
Pixie Lott
 DJ sets by Rusty Egan

Saturday
Australian Pink Floyd
Ultravox
Calvin Harris
McFly
Will Young
Mercury Rev
The Rakes
The Maccabees
Jessie Evans
The Operators
The Arcadian Kicks
Deborah Hodgson
 DJ sets by Rusty Egan

Sunday
The Charlatans
 Killing Joke
 The Horrors
 Black Lips
 The Rumble Strips
 The Pains of Being Pure at Heart
 Hatcham Social
 S.C.U.M
 Poppy & the Jezebels
 We Could Be Giants
 Dance for Burgess
 Dj sets by Tim Burgess and Rhys Webb with The She Set

Rumours
In October 2008 it was rumoured that Oasis would be headlining the festival on the Saturday night, according to the Virtual Festivals website. It claimed that the band would be starting their European tour with the Isle of Wight Festival. This was denied on 11 February by the festival's organiser.

U2 have also been rumoured to headline on Sunday.

Other festival rumours have included:
 Kings of Leon
 Elbow
 Paul Weller
 Girls Aloud
 Duffy
 Seasick Steve
 Keane

BBC comedy stars Gavin & Stacey could be on the bill and it was reported in the News of the World that Horne and Corden would perform as a band at the festival.

Awards
So far, the Isle of Wight Festival has been shortlisted for the "Best Live Event" category of the 2009 NME Awards.

References

External links
Isle of Wight Festival Official Website

2009
2009 in British music
2009 in England
21st century on the Isle of Wight